The Greenland Gap Group is a geologic group in West Virginia. It preserves fossils dating back to the Devonian period.

See also

 List of fossiliferous stratigraphic units in West Virginia

References
 

Geologic groups of West Virginia